Quercus lobata, commonly called the valley oak or roble, grows into the largest of California oaks. It is endemic to California, growing in interior valleys and foothills from Siskiyou County to San Diego County. Mature specimens may attain an age of up to 600 years. This deciduous oak requires year-round access to groundwater.

Its thick, ridged bark is characteristic and resembles alligator hide. The valley oak's deeply lobed leaves assist in identification.

Description
The valley oak may surpass  in height, with a sturdy trunk possibly exceeding  in diameter.

The branches have an irregular, spreading and arching appearance that produce a profound leafless silhouette in the clear winter sky. During autumn, the leaves turn a yellow to light orange color but become brown later in the season. In advancing age, the branches assume a drooping characteristic. The tree's pewter-colored rippled bark adds to the attractive aesthetic of this species.

The leaf width is approximately one half its length. Each leaf is matte green with an underneath pale green appearance; moreover, the leaf is covered with abundant soft fuzz, yielding an almost velvety feeling. When a fresh leaf is rubbed or broken, an aromatic scent is exuded, evoking a forest odor. The wood is a dull brown approaching yellow.

The caps have deep stippling and are found most often as singlets, but occasionally as doublets. The acorns ripen from October to November. Viable acorns germinate in their first winter, and none remain by mid-winter.

Taxonomy
Valley oak is of the white oak evolutionary lineage, which is officially known as the subgenus Lepidobalanus. This subgenus comprises numerous oaks from California and elsewhere, which species share similar leaves, acorns, bark and wood pulp. Early settlers used a variety of common names for the valley oak including: white oak, bottom oak, swamp oak, water oak and mush oak. The Spaniards, because the tree looked like the white oaks in Europe, called the tree "roble".

The Concow tribe call the acorns lō-ē’ (Konkow language).

Distribution and habitat
Valley oak tolerates cool wet winters and hot dry summers, but requires abundant water. It is most abundant in rich deep soils of valley floors below 600 meters (2000 feet) in elevation. Valley oak is found in dense riparian forests, open foothill woodlands and valley savannas. Commonly associated trees are coast live oak, interior live oak, blue oak, California black walnut, California sycamore and gray pine.

The valley oak is widely distributed in: the California Central Valley; many smaller valleys such as the San Fernando Valley (original Spanish place-name from oak savannah), Conejo Valley, and Santa Ynez Valley; the Inner Coast Ranges south of the Eel River; and the Transverse Ranges from the Tehachapi Mountains to the Simi Hills, Santa Susana Mountains. It is also present on Santa Cruz Island and Catalina Island in the Pacific Ocean. Some of the most picturesque stands are found in Sonoma Valley, Round Valley in Mendocino County and the southern Salinas Valley near the up-river reaches of the Salinas River.

Ecology
Like many oaks, valley oaks can tolerate wildfires. Although smaller individuals may be top-killed, most resprout from the root crown.

A variety of mammals and birds eat the acorns, including the acorn woodpecker, California scrub jay, yellow-billed magpie, and California ground squirrel. The acorns are also attacked by bruchid beetles, but can survive moderate levels of infestation.

Globular galls up to several centimeters in diameter are frequently attached to twigs of mature specimens of valley oak. These house the larval stage of small indigenous wasps Andricus quercuscalifornicus. A related wasp species, A. kingi, produces small galls shaped like Hershey's kisses on leaf surfaces. The valley oak is the only known food plant of Chionodes petalumensis caterpillars.

Uses
The acorns are sweet and edible; Native Americans including the Southern Paiute people roasted them and ground the edible portion into meal to make into bread and mush.

Difficulties in acquiring valley oak wood as well as issues stemming from its drying such as cracking and warping have shifted its consumption from a general purpose lumber to a primarily niche product. Valley oak wood has a small, but significant market for use in cabinetry though, and is also suitable for hardwood flooring. Tyloses present in the pores of valley oak wood increase its impermeability to fluids allowing it to be used in the production of water-tight vessels. Such vessels include wine barrels where valley oak wood sees limited role in the composition of and where it has similar properties to other white oaks such as a reduced tannin load compared to the red oaks and an open grain that allows for an increased transfer of oxygen.

Observational history 
In 1792, the English explorer George Vancouver noted on his expedition through the Santa Clara Valley, after seeing an expanse of valley oaks:

In the year 1861, William Henry Brewer, the chief botanist for the first California Geological Survey wrote of the valley oaks that he saw in Monterey County:

The Hooker Oak of Chico, California, was once considered the largest-known valley oak.

See also 
 California oak woodland
 List of Quercus species

References

External links

 
 

lobata
Endemic flora of California
Trees of the Southwestern United States
Natural history of the California chaparral and woodlands
Natural history of the California Coast Ranges
Natural history of the Central Valley (California)
Natural history of the Channel Islands of California
Natural history of the San Francisco Bay Area
Natural history of the Santa Monica Mountains
Natural history of the Transverse Ranges
Trees of Mediterranean climate
Plants described in 1801
Garden plants of North America
Drought-tolerant trees
Ornamental trees